Islamnagar is a neighbourhood located within Lahore Cantonment (UC 152) of Lahore, Punjab, Pakistan. Although part of Lahore City District, Islamnagar is governed directly by the Lahore Cantonment Board.

Landmarks
 Arfa Karim Software Technology Park
 Packages Mall

References

Lahore Cantonment